Itsandzéni is a village on the island of Grande Comore (Ngazidja) in the Comoros. In 1991, the village had a population of 1040.

To know on Itsandzeni

References

Populated places in Grande Comore